The 2018–19 Linafoot was the 58th season of the Linafoot, the top-tier football league in the Democratic Republic of the Congo, since its establishment in 1958. The season started on 23 September 2018.

League table

References

Linafoot seasons
Congo DR
football